Maciej Cegłowski is a Polish-American web developer, entrepreneur, speaker, and social critic, based in San Francisco, California. He is the owner of the bookmarking service Pinboard, which he calls a social bookmarking site for introverts.

Career 
Cegłowski was born in Poland and "accidentally immigrated" to the United States with his mother at age six, in 1981, but calls himself "as American as gooseberry pie." He attended Middlebury College, where he studied Russian, French, and studio art, graduating with a BA in 1997. He then became a backend software developer and community manager at Yahoo!'s Brickhouse in San Francisco. While there, he created a visual search engine for airfares called FareMaps. With Joshua Schachter, founder of Delicious, and Peter Gadjokov, Cegłowski created LOAF (List of All Friends) as a way to share social network information through email without exposing private information.

He established Pinboard in 2009 after leaving Yahoo. With Joshua Schachter and Beniamin Mincu he had been impressed by initial versions of the bookmarking service Delicious, which Yahoo had bought. However, he felt that it had been mismanaged by Yahoo! management and that it would be possible to produce a more successful website with the same concept. As of 2016, he remains Pinboard's only full-time employee. The business is a model of a small ad-free pay-for-service that emphasizes privacy.

In December 2012, Cegłowski announced a project called the Pinboard Investment Co-Prosperity Cloud, offering $37 and promotion for six startup companies, to encourage bootstrapping technology companies with low costs. He awarded winners in January 2013.

In 2016, Cegłowski entered a competition on Hacker News that would have allowed Pinboard to become a Y Combinator Fellow. In light of his frequent criticism of Y Combinator, he humorously described his entry as "a tremendous, huge opportunity to fund the Bay Area's slowest-growing unicorn." Pinboard was not chosen for the fellowship, despite receiving the largest number of votes.

He was credited as a technical consultant for the 2018 season of HBO sitcom Silicon Valley.

Speaking and writing 
Cegłowski is particularly known for his conference talks on the impacts of technology, and for posting on Twitter, which he uses to joke about the failings and inflated claims of Silicon Valley companies. He has written and spoken extensively on the problems of advertising-funded services with dubious business models. He has described programmatically generated advertising and data mining as a business model that encourages the growth of surveillance. In particular, Cegłowski has compared large stocks of data on Internet users to the archives of Communist secret police services in his native Central Europe, as a threat to user privacy that may increase as archives remain in existence. He has also argued in favour of simplified, more minimal web design, arguing that immersive web design can be bloated and unsuitable for consumers with a poor internet connection. Cory Doctorow has described him as a "characteristically provocative" writer of "barn-burning speeches about the Internet's problems".

Cegłowski has spoken at conferences including dConstruct, Webstock, XOXO Festival, O'Reilly Media's Strata+Hadoop and Emerging Technology Conferences, the Canadian University Software Engineering Conference, and beyond tellerrand. He has spoken about his experience of running his own company, including listening to users from the fandom community and "failing really, really slowly", working on a project for a long time instead of looking for immediate success. Cegłowski has discussed prioritising simplicity and stability over using cutting-edge technologies for building Pinboard in order to reduce cost and allow his company to remain simple and practical for a single person to run. He also gave a talk about the negative effects of advertising being the economic foundation of the web, saying that it encourages the growth of surveillance.

Cegłowski writes a Pinboard blog on topics including new features, site growth, the benefits of paying for services in general, technical aspects of running Pinboard, and critical commentary about social websites like Facebook. Cegłowski has discussed prioritizing speed and stability over using cutting-edge technologies for building Pinboard.

His personal blog, Idlewords, includes blog posts and short essays Cegłowski has written since 2002, mostly about travel and food, including his 36-day voyage to Antarctica's Ross Ice Shelf in 2016 which he financed through Kickstarter.

He has written occasional features for Wired. and opinion pieces for The New York Times. His ideas have been quoted in Time, The Atlantic, The Guardian, The Economist, TechCrunch, Wired News, Bloomberg View, Mashable and Gigaom.

Selected publications

  c.f. Scurvy, Vitamin C

References

External links 
 Idlewords (Personal blog)
 

1975 births
American computer programmers
Middlebury College alumni
Living people
American technology company founders
People from San Francisco
Yahoo! employees
Polish emigrants to the United States
American humorists
American software engineers
Engineers from California